Matriarch is the fifth studio album by American metalcore band Veil of Maya. It is the band's first album with vocalist Lukas Magyar. The album was produced, mixed and mastered by Taylor Larson of From First to Last.

Background
As stated by guitarist Marc Okubo, every song of the album talks about a female character that he liked in movies, TV shows or comics. The single "Phoenix" was released on January 1, 2015. Prior to the song's release, the band posted updates on their social media accounts with the hashtag "VeilHasRisen". A music video for the song "Mikasa" was released on March 23, as well as revealing the album's name and release date. The album became available for streaming on May 11.

Musical style
Matriarch is the first album by Veil of Maya to use clean vocals, which has caused some controversy among fans.

Track listing

Personnel
All credits by AllMusic.

Veil of Maya
 Lukas Magyar - vocals
 Marc Okubo - guitars, programming, artwork concept
 Danny Hauser - bass
 Sam Applebaum - drums

Additional musicians
 Jason Richardson – additional guitar on "Teleute"

Production
 Taylor Larson - production, engineering, mixing, mastering
 Diego Farias - additional production
 Matt Good - programming
 Ernie Slenkovich - Pro-Tools editing
 Spencer Sotelo - additional engineering
 Allan Hessler - additional vocal engineering on "Nyu", "Leeloo", "Ellie", "Aeris", "Three-Fifty" and "Daenerys"
 Ash Avildsen - additional vocal production on "Aeris"
 Nick Walters (Sumerian Records) - additional vocal production on "Daenerys", A&R, artwork concept

Management
 Derek Brewer (Outerloop Management) - management
 Josh Kline (The Agency Group) - North America booking
 Marco Walzel (Avocado Booking) - Europe booking

Artwork
 Daniel McBride - album artwork, layout, artwork concept
 Natsumi Suzuki - model
 Dana Pennington - model photography

References

2015 albums
Veil of Maya albums
Sumerian Records albums